The Norwegian National Time Trial Championships are held annually. They are a cycling race which decides the Norwegian cycling champion in the time trial discipline, across several categories of rider. The event was first held in 1921 and was won by Ole Moen. At the beginning there were often back-to-back wins from many riders. Recent multiple victors have included Edvald Boasson Hagen, Thor Hushovd, Kurt Asle Arvesen and Steffen Kjærgaard. The current champions are Tobias Foss and Ane Iversen.

Multiple winners

Men

Women

Men

Elite

Women

See also 
Norwegian National Road Race Championships
National Road Cycling Championships

References

External links 
the Cycling WebSite

National road cycling championships
Cycle races in Norway
Recurring sporting events established in 1921
National championships in Norway